Scott Smith (born July 13, 1986) is an American long distance runner who specialized in the marathon. He competed in the marathon event at the 2015 World Championships in Athletics in Beijing, China. For his collegiate career, Smith attended University of California, Santa Barbara.

References

External links
 
 Scott Smith profile UC Santa Barbara Gauchos
 Scott Smith profile Hoka Northern Arizona Elite Running Club
 Scott Smith profile 2020 United States Olympic Marathon Trials

1986 births
Living people
American male long-distance runners
American male marathon runners
World Athletics Championships athletes for the United States
People from Laguna Niguel, California
UC Santa Barbara Gauchos athletes
21st-century American people